Menippe adina is a species of crab, sometimes called the Gulf stone crab or Western Gulf stone crab. It is very closely related to the Florida stone crab, Menippe mercenaria, of which it is sometimes considered to be a subspecies.

Description
Stone crabs have a hard exoskeleton shell which is brownish red with gray spots on top but a tan underside. They have two large and unequally-sized chelae (claws), which have black tips. The males have a smaller carapace than females of a similar age, but males generally have larger chelae than females.

Range
The geographic range of M. adina overlaps with that of M. mercenaria, extending from Wakulla County, Florida around the Gulf of Mexico to Tamaulipas state, Mexico.

Fishery
Stone crabs are typically found feeding near jetties, oyster reefs, or other rocky areas, as well as in marshes, such as where blue crabs are, and can be caught with line or in traps. In most jurisdictions, only the right (usually crusher) claw of the Gulf Coast stone crab can be retained, which will regrow, and the crab is returned live to the spot from which it was harvested. The claw must be at least , as measured from the tip claw to the first joint beyond the moveable claw.

References

Commercial crustaceans
Crustaceans described in 1986
Crustaceans of the Atlantic Ocean
Edible crustaceans
Eriphioidea